Gauchsbach is a river of Bavaria, Germany. It passes through Feucht and flows into the Schwarzach near Wendelstein.

See also
List of rivers of Bavaria

References

Rivers of Bavaria
Rivers of Germany